Severn School was founded in 1914 by Roland M. Teel in Severna Park, Maryland, as a preparatory school for the United States Naval Academy. In 2013, Severn School merged with nearby Chesapeake Academy. Currently the school enrolls boys and girls from pre-school through grade 12.

Athletics
The Severn Admirals compete in thirteen varsity sports: sailing, lacrosse, cross country running, football, wrestling, soccer, basketball, swimming, baseball, golf, tennis, field hockey, as well as track and field in the Maryland Interscholastic Athletic Association. Severn has 35 varsity, junior varsity, and middle school teams.

Campus
On Severn's 19-acre upper school and middle school campus, there are several academic buildings, including Teel Academic Center and Creeden Hall connected by elevated glass bridges on the upper floors. Teel Academic Center underwent a complete renovation in 2015 where the original Teel Academic Center, constructed in 1969 to house boarding students, was torn down and replaced with the new 17 million dollar building. The new building houses Graw Innovation Center, a computer lab, the Zimmerman Library, and the Hoehn-Saric Family Center for Academic Excellence, as well as middle and upper school classrooms. Creeden Hall, constructed in 2002 as the Upper School Academic Center, contains science labs and prep rooms, a greenhouse, "Roche" Lecture Hall, classrooms, two computer labs, and several spaces for students such as Creeden Commons. Also on this campus is McCleary Student Center which houses Price Auditorium, Bauer Dining Hall, Powell Conference Room, and several arts classrooms for both the middle and upper school. In 2012, construction was completed on the Stine Outdoor Education Center, a 2-acre space behind the two academic buildings featuring a tiered outdoor classroom, trails, a counsel ring, challenge course with low ropes to promote team building, and an artist's reflection area.

Severn School has also finished the process of constructing the Edward St. John Athletic Center. The facility, opened April 2008, cost about $10 million dollars. Alongside the completion of this building was the construction of two turf fields, one for field hockey and lacrosse, and one for football and soccer, to accompany two more grass athletic fields.

The Chesapeake Campus in Arnold, obtained in 2013, houses Severn's Lower School. On that campus are Flinchum Gymnasium, Pat Troy Center, and Sivvy Theatre. There are 2 fully equipped outdoor playgrounds, an outdoor science learning area, learning pavilion, and trike and scooter path for early childhood students.

Notable alumni
 Distinguished alumni include three recipients of the Medal of Honor: RADM (then CDR) Herbert E. Schonland ('20), CAPT (then CDR) George L. Street III ('33) and RADM (then LCDR) Bruce McCandless ('28); 
 Slade Cutter ('30), four-time Navy Cross recipient and College Football Hall of Fame member 
 Tom Peters ('60), business management author 
 Joseph Caleb Deschanel ('62), cinematographer
 Joseph D. Stewart ('60), former United States Merchant Marine Academy superintendent 
 Henry W. Buse Jr. ('30), Lieutenant general in the Marine Corps, served as Chief of Staff, Headquarters Marine Corps
 Steve Bisciotti, Current Baltimore Ravens owner, attended Severn for two years in the 1970s. 
 John P. Condon ('30), Major general in the Marine Corps and Naval Aviator
 Robert Duvall, Actor and director
 Paul Brown, NFL coach was head football coach at Severn from 1930 to 1931
 Buzz Aldrin ('47), Apollo 11 astronaut, attended Severn in preparation for the entrance exams for the United States Military Academy.
 Mike Long ('90), former Magic: The Gathering Pro Tour champion

References

External links
The History of Severn School

Preparatory schools in Maryland
Private high schools in Maryland
Educational institutions established in 1914
Schools in Anne Arundel County, Maryland
Private middle schools in Maryland
1914 establishments in Maryland
Severna Park, Maryland